Linda S. Longstreth (born in Mannington, West Virginia) is an American politician and a Democratic member of the West Virginia House of Delegates representing District 50 since January 12, 2013. Longstreth served consecutively from January 2005 until January 2013 in a District 43 seat.

Education
Longstreth earned her BA from Fairmont State College (now Fairmont State University) and her MS from West Virginia University.

Elections
2012 Redistricted to District 50 along with fellow District 43 Representatives Mike Caputo and Tim Manchin, Longstreth placed second in the four-way May 8, 2012 Democratic Primary with 6,171 votes (27.2%), and placed second in the five-way three-position November 6, 2012 General election with 12,117 votes (23.2%) behind Representative Caputo (D) and ahead of Representative Manchin (D) and Republican nominees Barry Bledsoe and returning 2010 challenger Lynette McQuain.
2004 Longstreth challenged District 43 incumbent Representatives Caputo, Manchin, and Donna Renner and placed in the nine-way 2004 Democratic Primary displacing Representative Renner, and was elected in the six-way three-position November 2, 2004 General election with incumbents Caputo (D) and Manchin (D).
2006 Longstreth and Representatives Caputo and Manchin were challenged in the five-way 2006 Democratic Primary, but all placed, and were re-elected in the six-way three-position November 7, 2006 General election.
2008 Longstreth and Representatives Caputo and Manchin were unopposed for the May 13, 2008 Democratic Primary where Longstreth placed second with 9,800 votes (32.6%); Longstreth placed second in the four-way three-position November 4, 2008 General election with 14,567 votes (26.9%) behind of Representative Caputo (D) and ahead of Representative Manchin (D) and returning 2006 Republican nominee Rickie Starn.
2010 Longstreth and Representatives Caputo and Manchin were unopposed for the May 11, 2010 Democratic Primary where Longstreth placed second with 5,670 votes (33.2%); and placed second in the five-way three-position November 2, 2010 General election with 10,597 votes (21.1%) behind Representative Caputo (D) and ahead of Representative Manchin (D) and Republican nominees Rickie Starn (returning from 2006 and 2008), Travis Blosser, and Lynette McQuain.

References

External links
Official page at the West Virginia Legislature

Linda Longstreth at Ballotpedia
Linda Longstreth at OpenSecrets

Year of birth missing (living people)
Living people
Fairmont State University alumni
Democratic Party members of the West Virginia House of Delegates
People from Marion County, West Virginia
United States Army reservists
West Virginia University alumni
Women state legislators in West Virginia
Female United States Army personnel
21st-century American politicians
21st-century American women politicians
United States Army non-commissioned officers